Chon Byong-ju is a North Korean former footballer. He represented North Korea on at least two occasions in 1980.

Career statistics

International

References

Date of birth unknown
Living people
North Korean footballers
North Korea international footballers
Association football defenders
Year of birth missing (living people)